The 2. Oberliga Süd was the second-highest level of the German football league system in the south of Germany from 1950 until the formation of the Bundesliga in 1963. It covered the three states of Bavaria, Baden-Württemberg and Hesse.

Overview
The 2. Oberliga Süd was formed in 1950 as a feeder league to the Oberliga Süd which had been operating since 1945. It was the second of the three second Oberligas, the other two being 2. Oberliga West (1949) and 2. Oberliga Südwest (1951).

The winners and runners-up of this league were promoted to the Oberliga Süd, the bottom two teams relegated to the Amateurligas. Below the 2nd Oberliga were the following Amateurligas:

Amateurliga Bayern (split into northern and southern group from 1953)
Amateurliga Hessen
Amateurliga Württemberg (split into two groups from 1960)
Amateurliga Nordbaden
Amateurliga Südbaden

The 1. FC Pforzheim was the only club to have played all 13 seasons in the league.

Disbanding of the 2. Oberliga
In 1963 the league was dissolved. The teams on the places one to nine went to the new Regionalliga Süd, the new second division. The teams from 10 to 18 were relegated to the Amateurligas.

The following teams were admitted to the new Regionalliga:
FSV Frankfurt
ESV Ingolstadt
SV Waldhof Mannheim
1. FC Pforzheim
Freiburger FC
Stuttgarter Kickers
TSV Amicitia Viernheim
SpVgg Neu-Isenburg
Borussia Fulda

The following teams were relegated to the Amateurligas:
Amateurliga Bayern: VfB Helmbrechts, VfL Neustadt, SSV Jahn Regensburg, 1. FC Haßfurt
Amateurliga Hessen: SV Darmstadt 98, Viktoria Aschaffenburg, FC Hanau 93
Amateurliga Südbaden: FC Singen 04
Amateurliga Württemberg: VfR Heilbronn

Winners and runners-up of the 2. Oberliga Süd

Placings in the 2. Oberliga Süd 
The league placings from 1950 to 1963:

Source:

Key

Top scorers

Source:

References

Sources
 Kicker Almanach,  The yearbook on German football from Bundesliga to Oberliga, since 1937, published by the Kicker Sports Magazine
 Süddeutschlands Fussballgeschichte in Tabellenform 1897–1988  History of Southern German football in tables, publisher & author: Ludolf Hyll
 100 Jahre Süddeutscher Fussball-Verband  100-year-anniversary book of Southern German football Association, publisher: Vindelica Verlag, published: 1997
 Die Deutsche Liga-Chronik 1945–2005  History of German football from 1945 to 2005 in tables, publisher: DSFS, published: 2006

External links
 Das deutsche Fussball Archiv  Historic German league tables
 Oberliga Süd at Fussballdaten.de 

Defunct Oberligas (football)
Football competitions in Baden-Württemberg
Defunct football leagues in Bavaria
Football competitions in Hesse
1950 establishments in West Germany
1963 disestablishments in Germany
Sports leagues established in 1950
Ger